Gamasellus sternopunctatus is a species of mite in the family Ologamasidae.

References

sternopunctatus
Articles created by Qbugbot
Animals described in 1993